Thomas Strønen (born 7 December 1972) is a Norwegian jazz drummer who has recorded more than 70 albums. He has worked with  Iain Ballamy, Arve Henriksen, Mats Eilertsen, Ashley Slater, Eivind Aarset, Christian Fennesz, Nils Petter Molvaer, Bobo Stenson, John Taylor, Tore Brunborg, Morten Qvenild, Ingebrigt Håker Flaten, Sidsel Endresen, Bugge Wesseltoft, Tomasz Stanko, Koichi Makigami, Ernst Reijseger, Nils-Olav Johansen, and Stian Carstensen.

Career
Strønen attended the Jazz Program at Trondheim Musikkonservatorium (1995–99). He has participated in the following bands; Pohlitz (solo project), Humcrush with Ståle Storløkken and occasionally Sidsel Endresen, Food with Iain Ballamy and sometimes Christian Fennesz and the Swedish-Norwegian band Parish with Bobo Stenson, Mats Eilertsen trio (with Harmen Fraanje) Meadow with the British pianist John Taylor and Tore Brunborg. Furthermore, he plays with Maria Kannegaard Trio, Reflections in Cosmo (feat. Ståle Storløkken, Kjetil Møster, Hans Magnus "Snah" Ryan), Time Is A Blind Guide (feat. Ayumi Tanaka, Ole Morten Vågan, Leo Svensson Sander and Håkon Aase), Trinity and Turanga. He has also made several commissioned works, and produced and arranged works for a variety of artists. Strønen is also an associate professor at Norges Musikkhøgskole.

Strønen is recording for the renowned German label ECM and also for Rune Grammofon. As a composer, Strønen has contributed to the release of over seventy recordings as well as several commissioned works for festivals (including the Bath and Cheltenham Jazz Festival and Ultima Contemporary Music Festival) and radio (DR, BBC, Deutsche Rundfunk, NRK, BBC, Swedish Radio, and others).

Composer of commissioned works
Gildeskål-stevnet 1999, with the poet Tristan Vindthorn, performed at Ørnes July 1999, by the musicians Håvard Lund, Håvard Bendiksen and Ole Marius Sandberg
Cheltenham Jazzfestival 1999, with Iain Ballamy, performed by the band Food
Bath Jazzfestival 2000, with Iain Ballamy, Arve Henriksen, performed by the band Food
Dølajazz 2000, with Tomasz Stanko, Christian Wallumrød, Håkon Kornstad, Johan Bertling
Music for the percussion ensemble Bad Valley Drums (30 minutes of music) in 2001, 2002 and 2003
Music for the Ultima Festival, 2003 (for 6 percussionists)
Music for Parish 2004 recording for ECM (6 compositions)
Music for solo percussion and sampler for Nattjazz, (30 minutes of music) in 2004.
Music for solo percussion and sampler for Edinburgh Jazz Festival, (30 minutes of music) in 2004.
Exquisite Pain (Utsøgt Smerte) – Sophie Calle. Music for theatre in København, Århus and Odense. 
Time is a blind guide – Commission for Conexions 2013, NRK/ BBC. (National Jazzscene)
Badnajazz 2013. Commission for 25 drummers, saxophone (Tore Brunborg), elektronics and video. 
Winner of composition contest "Klangen av Kilden" (sound for Kilden)- sounds for the concert house Kilden (Kristiansand).
Commission for drum ensemble and saxophone (8 drummers), 60min, 5. Oktober 2012. 
Urban X. Music for dance- performance (30min) for The Norwegian Opera, 2011. 
Commission for 7 drummers, Cosmopolite and Victoria in 2010, 74 min. 
Commission (Food) for Cheltenham Jazzfestival, 2010. 
Film- music for TV2, Sneglehuset, 2009. 
Commission, strings and drums – celebration of Edvard Grieg's 100-year jubilee in UK, 55 min. (2007
 Urban X: Piece for drums, electronics and keyboards (30minutter) for The Norwegian Opera and ballet.
 Badnajazz, Vossajazz: Commission for kids. Piece for 25 drummers, saxophone, electronics, dance and video.
 Time is a blind guide: Commission for Conexions 2013, NRK/ BBC.
 Food/ Emulsion: Emulsion Sinfonietta, UK. Verk for Sinfonietta, 15min, 2014.
 Utsøgt Smerte/ Exquisite Pain: Sophie Calle. Theater i Copenhagen, Århus and Odense, DK. Full play.
 På drømt hav/ On Dreamt Ocean: Music/ installation with Knut Bry for Kjersti Alveberg, The Norwegian Opera and ballet.
 This is not a miracle: Composing full material for recording for ECM Records, 65min. Christian Fennesz/ Iain Ballamy.
 Civilization and its Discontents: Commission for Theatre by Mark Hewitt, Brighton, UK.
 Time is a blind guide/ Lucus: Composing full material for recording for ECM Records, Chamber ensemble.
 Sylvia: Commission for Theatre, Drama Teater, Tallinn, Estonia. Full piece.
 Lemur: Commission for Emulsion Sinfonietta, Cheltenham Music Festival. Durata 20 min.
 Extended blind Guide to India: Commission for Oslo World Festival, 2018. 75min for chamber-ensemble, drum- ensemble, vocal og steelguitar.
 Conversations with trees: Commission for Reading Fringe Festival (UK), 2019. Full concert for violin, accordion, voice, tap dance and drums.
 Bobo: Commission for Nordbotten Big band with Bobo Stenson (pn) as soloist, performed 10 times in 2019 to celebrate Stensons 75-years anniversary. Durata 25min.

Discography
 Pohlitz (Rune Grammofon, 2006)
 Time is a Blind Guide (ECM, 2015)
 Lucus (ECM, 2018) with Time is a Blind Guide (Ayumi Tanaka, Hakon Aåse, Lucy Railton, Ole Morten Vågan)
 Bayou (ECM, 2021) with Ayumi Tanaka and Marthe Lea

With Yelena Eckemoff
Nocturnal Animals (L & H Production, 2020)

With Parish
Rica (Challenge, 2003)
Parish (ECM, 2006)

With Food
 Food (Feral, 2000)
 Organic and GM Food (Feral, 2001)
 Veggie (Rune Grammofon, 2002)
 Last Supper (Rune Grammofon, 2004)
 Molecular Gastronomy (Rune Grammofon, 2007) with Iain Ballamy feat. Maria Kannegaard and Ashley Slater
 Quiet Inlet (ECM, 2010) feat. Christian Fennesz, Eivind Aarset, Prakash Sontakke, and Nils Petter Molvær
 Mercurial Balm (ECM, 2012), feat. Christian Fennesz, Eivind Aarset, Prakash Sontakke, Nils Petter Molvær
 This Is Not a Miracle (ECM, 2015) with Iain Ballamy, Christian Fennesz

With Humcrush
 Humcrush (Rune Grammofon, 2004) with Ståle Storløkken
 Hornswoggle (Rune Grammofon, 2006)
 Rest at World's End (Rune Grammofon, 2008)
 Ha! (Rune Grammofon, 2011) feat. Sidsel Endresen
 Enter Humcrush (Shhpuma, 2017)

With Maria Kannegaard Trio
 Breaking the Surface (ACT, 2000) with Maria Kannegaard, Mats Eilertsen
 Quiet Joy (Jazzland/Universal, 2005) with Maria Kannegaard, Ole Morten Vågan
 Camel Walk (Jazzland, 2008)

With Meadow
 Blissful Ignorance (Hecca/Musikkoperatørene, 2009) with John Taylor, Tore Brunborg

With Needlepoint
 The Woods Are Not What They Seem (BJK, 2010)
 Outside the Screen (BJK, 2012)

With others
 Atmosfear (Turnleft, 1997), with Bergmund Waal Skaslien
 Soundoff (Turnleft, 2000), with Bergmund Waal Skaslien
 Ståhls Blå (Dragon, 2001), with Ståhls blå
 Big Bambus (Bergland, 2001), with Big Bambus
 At First Light (Universal, 2001), with Silje Nergaard
 Love Seriously Damages Health (Bergland, (2001) with Siri Gjære
 Help is on Its Way (Ayler, 2003), with Bayashi
 African Flower (Haug, 2003), with Haug/Zanussi/Strønen
 Rica (Challenge, 2004), with Parish
 Absence in Mind (Jazzaway, 2004), with Anders Aarum Trio
 Skomsork (Park Grammofon, 2004), with Skomsork
 …………… (Caber, 2004), with Phil Bancroft Quartet
 Turanga (AIM, 2004), with Mats Eilertsen
 Schlachtplatte (Mooserobie, 2004), with Ståhls blå
 Sparkling (Jazzaway, 2004), with Trinity
 Rock! (Jazzaway, 2004), with Bayashi
 Time goes by (Universal, 2004), with Nora Brockstedt
 Soil (Ayler, 2004), with Fredrik Nordstrøm
 Flux (AIM, 2006), with Mats Eilertsen
 Monsters and Puppets (Gigafon, 2011) with Maria Kannegaard
 Voxpheria (Gigafon, 2012), with Tone Åse

References

External links
Pohlitz – Thomas Strøonen Myspace.com
Thomas Strøonen Biography – Norsk Musikkinformasjon Ballade.mo

1972 births
20th-century drummers
20th-century Norwegian drummers
21st-century Norwegian drummers
Living people
Musicians from Oslo
Norwegian jazz composers
Norwegian jazz drummers
Male drummers
Norwegian University of Science and Technology alumni
Rune Grammofon artists
Male jazz composers
20th-century Norwegian male musicians
21st-century Norwegian male musicians
Maria Kannegaard Trio members
Trondheim Jazz Orchestra members